Grafton is an unincorporated community in Chautauqua County, Kansas, United States.

History
Grafton had a post office from 1871 until 1906.

References

Further reading

External links
 Chautauqua County maps: Current, Historic, KDOT

Unincorporated communities in Chautauqua County, Kansas
Unincorporated communities in Kansas